Ebony is the unreleased fifth (and final studio album  to date) by the American West coast hip-hip artist, Yo-Yo. The album was meant to be released on September 29, 1998. However, Ebony was shelved because the guest appearances were not properly contracted to work with an artist on East West Records. Promotional copies of the album were printed prior to the album being shelved. Today, the album remains unreleased.

Track listing
"Intro" 
"Countin' Money"    
"Do You Wanna Ride?" (feat. Kelly Price)   [prod. Rashad Smith for Tumblin' Dice]
"Iz It All Still Good?" (feat. Gerald Levert)    
"Get Up (And Do Your Thing)"    
"Never Gonna Fall Again "   
"Fantasy"   
"Let Me Be The One"
"Good Girl"   
"I Would If I Could" (feat. Missy Elliott)
"Pass It On" (feat. Big Chan, Nic-Nak, Shorty G, Lady T)

References

External links
 at Allmusic

Yo-Yo (rapper) albums
1998 albums
East West Records albums
West Coast hip hop albums
Unreleased albums